Traditional Boat Race at the 2007 Southeast Asian Games wes held Mapprachan Reservoir, Chon Buri, Thailand.

Medal table

Medalists

Men

Women

External links
Southeast Asian Games Official Results

2007 Southeast Asian Games events
Boat racing at the Southeast Asian Games